The Notorious IBE is an international hip hop dance festival festival in Heerlen, The Netherlands. Between 1998 and 2005 the festival took place at Nighttown in Rotterdam, the Netherlands.  In 2008 the festival moved to the city of Heerlen in the southern province of Limburg (Netherlands).

Breakdance
Street dance competitions
Dance festivals in the Netherlands
Recurring events established in 1998
The Notorious IBE
The Notorious IBE
Hip hop dance festivals